King Xiang of Han (Chinese: 韩襄王; pinyin: Hán Xīang Wáng); also known as King Xiang'ai of Han (韩襄哀王) and King Daoxiang of Han (韩悼襄王) (died 296 BC), ancestral name Jì (姬), clan name Hán (韩), personal name Cāng (仓), was the ruler of the State of Han between 311 BC and until his death in 296 BC. He was the son of King Xuanhui of Han.

In 308 BC, King Xiang met with King Wu of Qin in Linjin (临晋). That autumn, Qin minister Gan Mao (甘茂) invaded Yiyang and took it in the following year, executing 60,000 soldiers. In 302 BC, King Xiang sent Crown Prince Ying (太子婴) to Qin as a hostage.

In 301 BC, Qin invaded Han and took Rang (穰). Qin then formed an alliance with Han, Wei, and Qi to attack Chu. Han forces were led by Bao Yuan (暴鸢). The alliance defeated Chu in the Battle of Chuisha (垂沙之战) and killed the Chu general Tang Mie.

In 300 BC, Crown Prince Ying died. Prince Jiu and Prince Jishi (虮虱) fought over the succession, but Prince Jishi ended up as a hostage in Chu. Chu then attacked Han and sieged Yongzhi (雍氏), modern day northeast Yuzhou, for 5 months. King Xiang sent multiple envoys to request aid from Qin, and finally Zhang Cui (张翠) was able to succeed. Qin sent Gan Mao and lifted the siege.

King Xiang died in 296 BC and was succeeded by his son King Xi of Han.

Ancestors

References

296 BC deaths
Zhou dynasty nobility
Monarchs of Han (state)
Year of birth unknown
290s BC deaths